A Baháʼí pilgrimage currently consists of visiting the holy places in Haifa, Acre, and Bahjí at the Baháʼí World Centre in Northwest Israel. Baháʼís do not have access to other places designated as sites for pilgrimage.

Baháʼu'lláh decreed pilgrimage in the Kitáb-i-Aqdas to two places: the House of Baháʼu'lláh in Baghdad, and the House of the Báb in Shiraz. In two separate tablets, known as Suriy-i-Hajj, he prescribed specific rites for each of these pilgrimages. It is obligatory to make the pilgrimage, "if one can afford it and is able to do so, and if no obstacle stands in one's way".  Baháʼu'lláh has "exempted women as a mercy on His part", though the Universal House of Justice has clarified that women are free to perform this pilgrimage. Baháʼís are free to choose between the two houses, as either has been deemed sufficient.  Later, ʻAbdu'l-Bahá designated the Shrine of Baháʼu'lláh at Bahjí (the Qiblih) as a site of pilgrimage. No rites have been prescribed for this.

The designated sites for pilgrimage are not accessible to the majority of Baháʼís, as they are in Iraq and Iran respectively, and thus when Baháʼís currently refer to pilgrimage, it refers to a nine-day pilgrimage that occurs at the Baháʼí World Centre in Haifa and Akká in Israel. This nine-day pilgrimage does not replace pilgrimage to the designated sites for pilgrimage, and it is intended that pilgrimage to the House of the Báb and the House of Baháʼu'lláh will occur in the future.

House of Baháʼu'lláh, Baghdad

The House of Baháʼu'lláh in Baghdad, also known as the "Most Great House" (Bayt-i-Aʻzam) and the "House of God," is where Baháʼu'lláh lived from 1853 to 1863 (except for two years when he left to the mountains of Kurdistan, northeast of Baghdad, near the city of Sulaymaniyah). It was located in the Kadhimiya district of Baghdad, near the western bank of the Tigris river. It is designated in the Kitáb-i-Aqdas as a place of pilgrimage and is considered a holy place by Baháʼís.

In 1922 the house was confiscated by Shí'ih authorities, who were hostile to the Baháʼí Faith. The Council of the League of Nations upheld the Baháʼí's claim to the house, but it has not yet been returned to the Baháʼí community.

The house was destroyed in June 2013, under circumstances that are currently unclear. The Universal House of Justice sent a letter to all the National Spiritual Assemblies on 27 June informing them of the house's destruction.

House of the Báb, Shiraz

In this house in Shiraz, Iran, the Báb declared his mission to Mullá Husayn on 23 May 1844.

In 1942-3 it was damaged by fire in an attack by enemies of the Baháʼí Faith, and in 1955 it was destroyed, but later again restored. In 1979 it was destroyed once more during the Iranian Revolution. In 1981 the site was made into a road and public square.

Current nine-day pilgrimage

The places that Baháʼís visit on the current nine-day pilgrimage at the Baháʼí World Centre include the following. (Baháʼí World Centre buildings contains additional information.)

Bahjí:
Shrine of Baháʼu'lláh
Mansion of Bahjí

Haifa:
Shrine of the Báb
Baháʼí Terraces
Arc
Seat of the Universal House of Justice
International Teaching Centre Building
Centre for the Study of the Sacred Texts
International Archives
Monument Gardens
Site of the future House of Worship
House of ʻAbdu'l-Bahá
Resting place of Amatu'l-Bahá Rúhíyyih Khanum
Pilgrim Houses:
Eastern Pilgrim House
10 Haparsim Street
4 Haparsim Street

Akká:
Garden of Ridván, Akká
House of ʻAbbúd
House of ʻAbdu'lláh Páshá
Mazra'ih

The nine-day pilgrimage is open only to Baháʼís and their spouses who have applied to go on pilgrimage. Due to limited space at the Baháʼí holy sites, a maximum of 500 Baháʼís at one time are allowed to visit Haifa. Baháʼís have to wait up to six years to come and are only allowed to visit again after another five-year wait.

Notes

References

Further reading

External links

Baháʼí Pilgrimage – Baháʼí World Centre
Photos of the Baháʼí Holy Places in Israel
Map of Haifa
Map of Akka
Pilgrimage to the House of the Báb

 
P